Pseudophilautus femoralis, commonly known as the round-snout pygmy frog, is a species of frog in the family Rhacophoridae. It is endemic to Sri Lanka.

Its natural habitat is subtropical or tropical moist montane forests. It is threatened by habitat loss.

References

femoralis
Frogs of Sri Lanka
Endemic fauna of Sri Lanka
Amphibians described in 1864
Taxa named by Albert Günther
Taxonomy articles created by Polbot